Beaconhouse National University (BNU) is a private liberal arts university located in Lahore, in the province of Punjab, Pakistan.

BNU was founded in 2003 by its parent company Beaconhouse School System, it is located at Raiwind, a subdivision of Lahore District; the BNU campus is adjacent to the Bahria Town.

BNU offers study programmes in visual design and arts, architecture, liberal arts, computer information technology, psychology and mass communication. It is  a member of the Higher Education Commission and the Association of Commonwealth Universities.

Schools 
The university consists of the following eight schools or institutes:
 
 Mariam Dawood School of Visual Arts & Design (MDSVAD)
 Razia Hassan School of Architecture  
 School of Media & Mass Communication (SMC)
 School of Business
 Seeta Majeed School of Liberal Arts & Social Sciences (SLASS)
 School of Computer & Information Technology (SCIT)
 School of Education
 Institute of Psychology
 School of CKG

Faculty
BNU has a 88 full-time and 92 adjunct faculty members including:
 Nayyar Ali Dada, architect.
 Tariq Rahman, Dean of School of Liberal Arts and Social Sciences in 2017; linguist.
 Asghar Nadeem Syed, Visiting Faculty at department of Theatre, Film and Television; he is a playwright, columnist, and author.
 Rashid Rana, School of Visual Arts and Design, artist.

Notable alumni
There are over 4100 students who graduated from BNU. 
Here are some selected graduates:

Dost Muhammad Khosa, politician
Daniyal Raheel, actor
Eman Suleman, actor and fashion model
Gohar Rasheed, theatre, television and film actor
Kubra Khademi, fine artist
Zara Noor Abbas, actress
Mooroo, musician, actor, vlogger
Amar Khan, actress
Zain Afzal, actor
 Sanam Saeed, theatre, television and film actor

References

External links
Beaconhouse National University, Lahore - Official website

 
Educational institutions established in 2003
Fashion schools in Pakistan
Private universities and colleges in Punjab, Pakistan
Film schools in Pakistan
Nayyar Ali Dada buildings and structures
2003 establishments in Pakistan